The 1973 World Junior Wrestling Championships were the third edition of the World Junior Wrestling Championships and were held in Miami Beach, United States 1973.

Medal table

Medal summary

Men's freestyle

Men's Greco-Roman

References

External links 
 UWW Database
FILA Database

W
1973 in American sports
World Junior Championships
Wrestling in the United States